The following highways are numbered 133:

Canada
 New Brunswick Route 133
 Ontario Highway 133 (former)
 Prince Edward Island Route 133
 Quebec Route 133

Costa Rica
 National Route 133

India
 National Highway 133 (India)

Japan
 Japan National Route 133

United Kingdom
 A133 road

United States
 Alabama State Route 133
 Arkansas Highway 133
 California State Route 133
 Colorado State Highway 133
 Connecticut Route 133
 County Road 133 (Columbia County, Florida)
 County Road 133B (Columbia County, Florida)
 County Road 133C (Columbia County, Florida)
 Georgia State Route 133
 Illinois Route 133
 Indiana State Road 133 (former)
 Iowa Highway 133 (former)
 K-133 (Kansas highway) (former)
 Kentucky Route 133
 Louisiana Highway 133
 Maine State Route 133
 Maryland Route 133
 Massachusetts Route 133
 Missouri Route 133
 Nebraska Highway 133
 New Jersey Route 133
 New Mexico State Road 133
 New York State Route 133
 County Route 133 (Cortland County, New York)
 County Route 133 (Montgomery County, New York)
 County Route 133 (Niagara County, New York)
 County Route 133 (Onondaga County, New York)
 County Route 130 (Rensselaer County, New York)
 County Route 133 (Schenectady County, New York)
 County Route 133 (Sullivan County, New York)
 County Route 133 (Tompkins County, New York)
 North Carolina Highway 133
 Ohio State Route 133
 Oklahoma State Highway 133
 Pennsylvania Route 133 (former)
 South Carolina Highway 133
 Tennessee State Route 133
 Texas State Highway 133 (former)
 Texas State Highway Spur 133
 Farm to Market Road 133
 Utah State Route 133
 Utah State Route 133 (1933-1969) (former)
 Vermont Route 133
 Virginia State Route 133
 Virginia State Route 133 (1926-1928) (former)
 Virginia State Route 133 (1930-1933) (former)
 Wisconsin Highway 133
 Wyoming Highway 133

Territories
 Puerto Rico Highway 133